Derik Steiner (born February 23, 1987) is an American football fullback who is currently a free agent. He played college football at Morehead State. He was signed as an undrafted free agent by the Green Bay Blizzard  of the IFL in 2010. He was later signed by the Trenton Steel of the Southern Indoor Football League (SIFL) in 2011. After the Steel, Steiner was assigned to the Cleveland Gladiators of the AFL where he played for two seasons. He was traded to the San Jose SaberCats on January 3, 2014 from the Cleveland Gladiators. He was reassigned by the SaberCats on April 4, 2014 and claimed by the Iowa Barnstormers on April 5, 2014.

References

External links
 Morehead State Bio
 Cleveland Gladiators Bio

1987 births
Living people
American football fullbacks
Morehead State Eagles football players
Green Bay Blizzard players
Trenton Steel players
Cleveland Gladiators players
San Jose SaberCats players
Iowa Barnstormers players
Players of American football from Ohio
People from Franklin, Ohio